Voyage to the Stars is a science fiction and improvised comedy podcast written and produced by Ryan Copple. The show starred Felicia Day and Kirsten Vangsness and was a production of Madison Wells Media in partnership with Earwolf. The show was later adapted into a four-part comic book mini-series of the same name published by IDW Publishing, illustrated by Connie Daidone, and written by James Asmus.

Background 
The podcast's first episode premiered on February 12, 2019. The show was written and produced by Ryan Copple with audio production by Steven Ray Morris. The show is a Madison Wells Media production in partnership with Earwolf. According to Jeff Spry of Syfy Wire, the show was regularly among the top 100 comedy shows, received 2.5 million downloads, and had over 100,000 viewers on Twitch within the first year of production. The show is an improvised science fiction comedy that satirizes the tropes typically used in the genre. Felicia Day and Kristen Vangsness starred in the show. Season two was a 26 part series that was launched in September of 2019.

Plot 

The story follows a space-captain named Tucker Lentz, a mechanic named Stew Merkel, an artificial intelligence named Sorry, and a science officer named Elsa Rankfort. The characters travel to various planets throughout the first season causing problems wherever they go. In one of the episodes, the artificial intelligence responsible for flying the spaceship decides that it needs to exterminate the crew who spend the episode attempting to talk the artificial intelligence out of killing them.

Characters 

 Colton Dunn as Tucker Lentz
 Felicia Day as Elsa Rankfort
 Steve Berg as Stew Merkel
 Janet Varney as Sorry the A.I.

Adaption 
The show was adapted into a four-part comic book mini-series published by IDW Publishing, illustrated by Connie Daidone, and written by James Asmus. The first issue was released on August 19, 2020 and two of the covers for the first issue were illustrated by Freddie Williams II. Ed Fortune of Starburst Magazine critiqued the comic book for leaning too heavily on dialogue saying that the "art-style does a lot of the heavy lifting ... it’s just a pity it’s buried under so many word balloons." The plot of the comic book follows a group of characters who leave a dying earth and attempt to defeat the "Nothing."

See also 

 List of science fiction podcasts

References

External links 

2019 podcast debuts
Audio podcasts
Science fiction podcasts
Comedy and humor podcasts